45th CAS Awards
February 14, 2009

Theatrical Releases: 
Slumdog Millionaire

The 45th Cinema Audio Society Awards, which were held on February 14, 2009, honored the outstanding achievements in sound mixing in film and television of 2008.

Winners and nominees

Film
 Slumdog Millionaire
 The Dark Knight
 Iron Man
 Quantum of Solace
 WALL-E

Television

Series
 24: Redemption
 Dexter (Episode: "Turning Biminese")
 House (Episode: "Lost Resort")
 Lost (Episode: "Meet Kevin Johnson")
 Mad Men (Episode: "The Jet Set")

Miniseries or Television Film
 John Adams (Episode: "Join or Die")
 Generation Kill (Episode: "A Burning Dog")
 John Adams (Episode: "Don't Tread on Me")
 John Adams (Episode: "Independence")
 Recount

References

2008 film awards
2008 television awards
2008 guild awards
Cinema Audio Society Awards
2009 in American cinema